Accorsi is an Italian surname. Notable people with the surname include:

Ernie Accorsi (born 1941), American football executive
Jay Accorsi (born 1963), American football coach
Stefano Accorsi (born 1971), Italian actor

Italian-language surnames